The 2016 BWF Grand Prix Gold and Grand Prix was the tenth season of the BWF Grand Prix Gold and Grand Prix.

Schedule
Below is the schedule released by Badminton World Federation:

Results

Winners

Performance by countries
Tabulated below are the Grand Prix performances based on countries. Only countries who have won a title are listed:

Grand Prix Gold

Malaysia Masters

Syed Modi International

Thailand Masters

German Open

Swiss Open

New Zealand Open

China Masters

Chinese Taipei Open

U.S Open

Indonesian Masters

Thailand Open

Bitburger Open

Macau Open

Korea Masters

Grand Prix

Canada Open

Vietnam Open

Brazil Open

Russian Open

Chinese Taipei Masters

Dutch Open

Scottish Open

References

Grand Prix Gold and Grand Prix
BWF Grand Prix Gold and Grand Prix